It's On with Alexa Chung is an American live interactive talk and variety program that aired weekdays on  MTV from June 15 to December 17, 2009.  The show, a "successor" to MTV's Total Request Live, was hosted by British model-turned-television personality Alexa Chung.

Details
The series was a mash-up of television and web content, featuring live music performances, celebrity interviews, videos, and content from social networking sites such as Facebook and Twitter, targeting teenagers who have "been fleeing television for the Web."

The show used Twitter and Facebook in order to "make sure there aren't a lot of layers of filters so people feel like they're part of the audience". Nelson gives examples such as using viewers' Facebook profiles as song lyrics and allowing viewers to ask questions to celebrities via Twitter.  The show was canceled in 2009.

References

External links
 
 

2009 American television series debuts
2009 American television series endings
2000s American music television series
American television talk shows
American non-fiction web series
English-language television shows
MTV original programming